The Egorychev method is a collection of techniques introduced by Georgy Egorychev for finding identities among sums of binomial coefficients, Stirling numbers, Bernoulli numbers, Harmonic numbers, Catalan numbers and other combinatorial numbers.  The method relies on two observations.  First, many identities can be proved by extracting coefficients of generating functions.  Second, many generating functions are convergent power series, and coefficient extraction can be done using the Cauchy residue theorem (usually this is done by integrating over a small circular contour enclosing the origin).  The sought-for identity can now be found using manipulations of integrals.  Some of these manipulations are not clear from the generating function perspective.  For instance, the integrand is usually a rational function, and the sum of the residues of a rational function is zero, yielding a new expression for the original sum.  The residue at infinity is particularly important in these considerations.
Some of the integrals employed by the Egorychev method are:
 First binomial coefficient integral
 
where 
 Second binomial coefficient integral
 
where 
 Exponentiation integral
 
where 
 Iverson bracket
 
where 
 Stirling number of the first kind
 
where 
 Stirling number of the second kind
 
where

Example I 

Suppose we seek to evaluate

which is claimed to be :

Introduce :

and :

This yields for the sum : 

This is 

Extracting the residue at  we get 
 

thus proving the claim.

Example II 

Suppose we seek to evaluate 

Introduce

Observe that this is zero when  so we may extend  to
infinity to obtain for the sum

 

and furthermore

to get for the integral

This evaluates by inspection to (use the Newton binomial)

 

the choice of square root. For the conditions on 
and   we have  that for the  series to  converge we
contour   of     comes  to   the  origin   is
   so   we   choose        for      example       This also  ensures that   so   does  not intersect  the branch
).  For  example 
and  will work.

This example also yields to simpler methods but was included here to demonstrate the effect of substituting into the variable of integration.

Computation using formal power series 

We may use the change of variables rule 1.8 (5) from the Egorychev text
(page 16) on the integral

get  and find

This becomes

or alternatively

Observe that 
so this is

and the rest of the computation continues as before.

External links 

 Hosam Mahmoud, 2022, History and examples of Egorychev method
 Marko Riedel, 2022, Computational examples of using the Egorychev method to evaluate sums involving types of combinatorial numbers

References 
 

Factorial and binomial topics